Sergio Augusto Guevara González (born 7 July 1973) is a Guatemalan football coach and former player. He is the current head coach for Primera División club Mixco.

Club career
Nicknamed el Chejo, Guevera has played for Aurora before joining CSD Municipal in 2003.

International career
Guevara made his debut for Guatemala in a March 2004 friendly match against El Salvador and has earned a total of 3 caps, scoring no goals. He has represented his country in 2 FIFA World Cup qualification matches.

References

External links

Player profile - CSD Municipal

1973 births
Living people
Sportspeople from Guatemala City
Guatemalan footballers
Guatemala international footballers
C.S.D. Municipal players
Aurora F.C. players

Association football midfielders